West Dennis is a census-designated place (CDP) in the town of Dennis in Barnstable County, Massachusetts, United States. The population was 2,242 at the 2010 census.

Geography
West Dennis is located in the southwest corner of the town of Dennis at  (41.661753, -70.161975). It is bordered to the north by the CDP of South Dennis, to the east by Dennis Port, to the south by Nantucket Sound, and to the west by South Yarmouth.

Climate

In a typical year, West Dennis, Massachusetts temperatures fall below 50F° for 167 days per year. Annual precipitation is typically 43.5 inches per year (high in the US) and snow covers the ground 0 days per year or 0% of the year (the lowest in the US). It may be helpful to understand the yearly precipitation by imagining 9 straight days of moderate rain per year. The humidity is below 60% for approximately 27.6 days or 7.6% of the year.

Education
The Ezra H. Baker Elementary School, named for Ezra Henry Baker, is found in West Dennis.

Demographics

As of the census of 2000, there were 2,570 people, 1,279 households, and 698 families residing in the CDP. The population density was 301.6/km (781.3/mi). There were 2,733 housing units at an average density of 320.7/km (830.8/mi). The racial makeup of the CDP was 95.53% White, 2.37% African American, 0.54% Native American, 0.31% Asian, 0.43% from other races, and 0.82% from two or more races. Hispanic or Latino of any race were 0.93% of the population.

There were 1,279 households, out of which 13.0% had children under the age of 18 living with them, 44.0% were married couples living together, 7.3% had a female householder with no husband present, and 45.4% were non-families. 38.5% of all households were made up of individuals, and 20.6% had someone living alone who was 65 years of age or older. The average household size was 1.96 and the average family size was 2.53.

In the CDP, the population was spread out, with 13.0% under the age of 18, 4.6% from 18 to 24, 22.0% from 25 to 44, 28.2% from 45 to 64, and 32.2% who were 65 years of age or older. The median age was 53 years. For every 100 females, there were 83.8 males. For every 100 females age 18 and over, there were 81.7 males.

The median income for a household in the CDP was $35,350, and the median income for a family was $50,156. Males had a median income of $37,266 versus $29,625 for females. The per capita income for the CDP was $26,667. About 7.0% of families and 10.7% of the population were below the poverty line, including 20.6% of those under age 18 and 7.5% of those age 65 or over.

Notable Person

Tom Skeyhill (1895-1932), Ghostwrote Sergeant York

References

External links
 West Dennis Free Public Library

Census-designated places in Barnstable County, Massachusetts
Census-designated places in Massachusetts
Dennis, Massachusetts
Populated coastal places in Massachusetts